The 2021 Adelaide International was a tennis tournament on the 2021 WTA Tour. It was played on outdoor hard courts in Adelaide, South Australia, Australia. The Adelaide International is a WTA 500 Tournament.

It was the second time this tournament was held and it took place at the Memorial Drive Tennis Centre from the 22nd to the 27th of February, 2021. For 2021, with the COVID-19 pandemic causing travel chaos, the ATP event was moved to Melbourne. It was held alongside another 250 tournament called Melbourne 2 and the ATP Cup. Adelaide was temporarily renamed the Great Ocean Road Open. The WTA event will be held the week after the Australian Open, in Adelaide. Ashleigh Barty of Australia won the 2020 edition and sought to defend her domestic title. The tournament was eventually won by Iga Swiatek, who claimed her second career title, defeating Belinda Bencic in two sets.

Champions

Women's singles 

  Iga Świątek def.  Belinda Bencic, 6–2, 6–2

Women's doubles 

  Alexa Guarachi /  Desirae Krawczyk def.  Hayley Carter /  Luisa Stefani, 6–7(4–7), 6–4, [10–3]

Points and prize money

Point distribution

Prize money 

*per team

Singles main-draw entrants

Seeds 

 1 Rankings are as of 5 March 2005.

Other entrants 
The following players received wildcards into the singles main draw:
  Ashleigh Barty
  Olivia Gadecki
  Samantha Stosur
  Ajla Tomljanović

The following players received entry from the qualifying draw:
  Madison Brengle
  Coco Gauff
  Maddison Inglis
  Jasmine Paolini
  Liudmila Samsonova
  Storm Sanders

The following players received entry as lucky losers:
  Misaki Doi
  Christina McHale

Withdrawals 
Before the tournament

Doubles main-draw entrants

Seeds 

 1 Rankings are as of 8 February 2021.

Withdrawals 
Before the tournament
  Anna Blinkova /  Veronika Kudermetova → replaced by  Sharon Fichman /  Coco Gauff
  Chan Hao-ching /  Latisha Chan → replaced by  Arina Rodionova /  Storm Sanders
  Gabriela Dabrowski /  Bethanie Mattek-Sands → replaced by  Bethanie Mattek-Sands /  Asia Muhammad
  Nicole Melichar /  Demi Schuurs → replaced by  Kaitlyn Christian /  Sabrina Santamaria
  Samantha Stosur /  Zhang Shuai → replaced by  Ellen Perez /  Samantha Stosur

References 

8. Adelaide International 2021: Belinda Bencic vs Misaki Doi preview, head-to-head & prediction

9. Drama as Ash Barty crashes out in Adelaide shock defeat

10. Barty to defend Adelaide International title

External links 
 
 WTA tournament Official website
Ashleigh Barty vs Danielle Collins. 2021 Adelaide International video

2021 Adelaide International
2021 WTA Tour
Adel
February 2021 sports events in Australia